Macrocyclops is a genus of copepods belonging to the family Cyclopidae. There are currently 13 described species found in fresh water habitats throughout the world:

Macrocyclops albicans G.W. Smith, 1909
Macrocyclops albidus (Jurine, 1820)
Macrocyclops annulicornis (Koch, 1838)
Macrocyclops baicalensis Mazepova, 1962
Macrocyclops bistriatus (Koch, 1838)
Macrocyclops coronatus (Claus, 1857)
Macrocyclops distinctus (Richard, 1887)
Macrocyclops fuscus (Jurine, 1820)
Macrocyclops monticola Ishida, 1994
Macrocyclops neuter Kiefer, 1931
Macrocyclops oithonoides Roen, 1957
Macrocyclops oligolasius Kiefer, 1938
Macrocyclops signatus (Koch, 1838)

References

Cyclopoida genera
Cyclopidae